Reg Cooke is a New Zealand former rugby league footballer who represented New Zealand in the 1960 World Cup.

Playing career
Cooke originally played in the Waikato Rugby League competition and represented Waikato. In 1960 he was selected for the New Zealand national rugby league team squad for the 1960 World Cup but did not play in a match.

Instead, he made his debut in 1961 against Australia. For the 1961 season Cooke had moved north to Auckland, joining the Papakura club who played as part of Eastern United in the Auckland Rugby League competition. He also represented Auckland, who defended the Northern Union Cup against Canterbury and the West Coast that year. At the end of the season Cooke toured Great Britain and France with the Kiwis.

Cooke joined City-Newton in 1964 and went on to score 205 points for them that season. After several years of only representing Auckland Cooke was again selected for New Zealand that year, playing his final test against France.

Cooke later moved to Australia and played for Queensland Firsts four times in 1967.

References

Living people
New Zealand rugby league players
New Zealand national rugby league team players
Waikato rugby league team players
Auckland rugby league team players
Queensland rugby league team players
Papakura Sea Eagles players
City Newton Dragons players
Rugby league wingers
Rugby league centres
Year of birth missing (living people)